Debaprasad (দেবপ্রসাদ) is a Bengali male name. The following is a list of people having this name:

Debaprasad Chakraborty, Bengali lyricist
Debaprasad Ghosh, Bengali mathematician 
Deba Prasad Gupta, Bengali revolutionary 
Deba Prasad Das, Indian classical dancer
Deva Prasad Sarbadhikari, Indian lawyer, educationist and a vice chancellor of Calcutta University
Deba Prasad Mitra, Bengali educationist 

Indian masculine given names